The 2001–02 Eastern European Hockey League season, was the seventh season of the multi-national ice hockey league. 17 teams participated in the league, and HK Liepajas Metalurgs of Latvia won the championship.

Regular season

EEHL A

EEHL B

Qualification

 HK Khimvolokno Mogilev - HK Sokol Kiev 3:1 (0-0,2-1,1-0)
 HK Sokol Kiev - HK Khimvolokno Mogilev 4:0 (1-0,3-0,0-0)

Playoffs

3rd place
HK Berkut Kiev 1.5 - HK MGU Moscow 0.5

External links
Season on hockeyarchives.info

EEHL
Eastern European Hockey League seasons